The following is a list of FCC-licensed radio stations in the U.S. state of Washington, which can be sorted by their call signs, frequencies, cities of license, licensees, and programming formats.

List of radio stations

Defunct
 KAPY-LP
 KBNO-FM
 KBVU
 KCFL-LP
 KCKO
 KEYG
 KFC
 KFKB
 KFWY
 KGRU-LP
 KIKN
 KISN
 KKZU
 KLFF
 KOWA-LP
 KREN
 KSVY
 KYAO-LP
 KZLF-LP

References

External links
 Radio-Locator: Seattle, WA

 
Washington
Radio stations